Minuscule 592 (in the Gregory-Aland numbering), α 567 (von Soden), is a Greek minuscule manuscript of the New Testament, on paper, dated by a Colophon to the year 1289. The manuscript has complex contents. It was labelled by Scrivener as 461.
Gregory labelled the manuscript by 592e, 207a, and 263p.

Description 

The codex contains the text of the New Testament except Book of Revelation on 295 paper leaves (size ). It is written in one column per page, 28-32 lines per page. It was written by many hands.

The order of books: Catholic epistles, Pauline epistles, Synaxarion, and Gospels. It contains an additional material about the councils.

Text 

The Greek text of the codex is a representative of the Byzantine text-type. Aland placed it in Category V. According to the Claremont Profile Method it represents the textual family Kx in Luke 1 and Luke 20. In Luke 10 no profile was made.

History 

The manuscript was added to the list of New Testament manuscripts by Scrivener. It was examined by Dean Burgon.

The manuscript currently is housed at the Biblioteca Ambrosiana (Z. 34 sup.), at Milan.

See also 

 List of New Testament minuscules
 Biblical manuscript
 Textual criticism

References

Further reading 

 A. Turyn, Dated Greek Manuscripts of the Thirteenth and Fourteenth Centuries in the Libraries of Italy, (Urbana, 1972), 45; description pp. 61–62.

Greek New Testament minuscules
14th-century biblical manuscripts